Myoporum viscosum, commonly known as sticky boobialla, is a plant in the figwort family, Scrophulariaceae and is endemic to South Australia. It is unusual in that sometimes, especially when the leaves are crushed, it has an extremely unpleasant smell.

Description
The base of the leaf partly wraps around the stem and the leaf blade is folded or curved with serrated edges and has many oil dots.

There are 5 triangular sepals and 5 petals joined at their bases to form a bell-shaped tube. The petals are white with a slight purplish flush and purple spots.

Taxonomy and naming
Myoporum viscosum was first formally described by botanist Robert Brown in Prodromus Florae Novae Hollandiae in 1810 from a specimen collected at Memory Cove. The specific epithet is derived from the Latin word viscum meaning "bird-lime" with the ending -osus "abounding in", that is, "sticky" or "viscid".

Distribution and habitat
For many years this species has been confused with the much more common species Myoporum petiolatum which has thinner, noticeably petiolate and non-odorous leaves. Myoporum viscosum has a restricted distribution encompassing Kangaroo Island and coastal areas of the Eyre and Yorke peninsulas.

Use in horticulture
Sticky boobialla is a hardy plant which can tolerate salt spray and can be used as a low screening plant. It is readily propagated from cuttings and grows best in full sun.

References

viscosum
Flora of South Australia
Lamiales of Australia
Plants described in 1810
Taxa named by Robert Brown (botanist, born 1773)